Eugene D. Swift (born September 14, 1964) is an American retired hurdler.

He was born in Oakland, California. He finished sixth at the 1996 Olympic Games. At the 1999 Pan American Games he won the bronze medal in the 110 metres hurdles and finished fourth in the 4 × 100 metres relay.

His personal best time was 13.21 seconds, achieved three times. Indoors, in the 60 metre hurdles, he ran in 7.67 seconds in 1998.

References

1964 births
Living people
People from Oakland, California
Track and field athletes from California
American male hurdlers
Olympic track and field athletes of the United States
Athletes (track and field) at the 1996 Summer Olympics
Pan American Games track and field athletes for the United States
Athletes (track and field) at the 1999 Pan American Games
Pan American Games medalists in athletics (track and field)
Pan American Games bronze medalists for the United States
Medalists at the 1999 Pan American Games